Louis Joseph Battan (February 9, 1923 – October 29, 1986) was an American atmospheric scientist who received his doctorate from the University of Chicago in 1953, where he was hired to work in the field of the physics of clouds and precipitation. In 1958 he was appointed professor of meteorology and associate director of the Institute of Atmospheric Physics at the University of Arizona in Tucson. He was a pioneer in cloud physics and radar meteorology.

Battan's parents, Anibale and Louise Battan, immigrated to the United States from northern Italy, a region known as Trentino-Alto Adige.

Career 
Along with his colleague and close friend, David Atlas, Battan underwent rigorous training in radar engineering and meteorology in the U.S. Army Air Corps, at Harvard University, and the Massachusetts Institute of Technology (MIT) during World War II. He received his B.S. from New York University (NYU) in 1946 and then moved to the University of Chicago where he obtained his M.S. and a Ph.D. in 1953. During the Thunderstorm Project (1946–48), Dr. Battan used radar analysis to show precipitation initiation from coalescence in midlatitude convective clouds. He, along with Dr. Roscoe Braham Jr. and Dr. Horace R. Byers, conducted one of the first randomized experiments on cloud modification by the artificial nucleation of cumulus clouds.

After obtaining his Ph.D., he remained at Chicago until 1958. Then he became a professor in the Department of Atmospheric Sciences and Institute for Atmospheric Physics, University of Arizona, and served as its director from 1973 to 1982. There he conducted research on clouds, precipitation processes, lightning, and radar relationships. He led the development of the first 3-cm Doppler weather radar to measure vertical motion and particle sizes in thunderstorms in 1964.

He was the American Meteorological Society (AMS) president from 1966 to 1967 and served on numerous national and international committees including the U.S. President's National Advisory Committee on Oceans and Atmosphere in 1978. He was instrumental in the founding of the National Center for Atmospheric Research (NCAR). He received many awards including the AMS Meisinger Award in 1962 and the AMS Half Century Award in 1975.

The Louis J. Battan Author's Award 
Battan was a prolific writer whose repertoire includes one of the first textbooks on radar meteorology in 1959 and Radar Observation of the Atmosphere in 1973, which became the reference text on the subject. He authored 16 books and more than 100 articles. His contribution to meteorological education, through publications written in an accessible and informative style, has been honored by the AMS with the establishment of two annual "Louis J. Battan Author's Awards".

Recipients of the Louis J. Battan Author's Award (Adult) include: 
James Rodger Fleming, Professor of Science, Technology, and Society, Colby College, Waterville, Maine (2012); 
Chris Mooney, Contributing Editor, Science Progress & Author, Washington, DC (2009); 
Kerry Emanuel (2007); 
Charles Wohlforth (2006); 
John M. Nese, Glenn Schwartz (2005); 
Robert C. Sheets (2004); 
Susan Solomon (2003); 
Erik Larson (2002); 
Howard B. Bluestein (2001); 
Richard C. J. Somerville (2000); 
Zbigniew Sorbjan (1998);
Jack Fishman, Robert Kalish (1997); 
Thomas E. Graedel, Paul J. Crutzen (1996); 
Edward N. Lorenz (1995); 
Jack Williams (1994); 
Robert Marc Friedman (1993); 
John W. Firor (1992); 
Stephen H. Schneider (1990);
Craig F. Bohren (1989).

Legacy 
Dr. Battan's work and contributions to the world of meteorology:
 1964. The nature of violent storms (La Naturaleza de las Tormentas, en español, EUDEBA). 158 pp.
 1965. Física y siembra de nubes. Volumen 26 de Ciencia joven. EUDEBA. 159 pp.
 1980. The unclean sky; a meteorologist looks at air pollution. 153 pp.
 Cloud physics and cloud seeding
 Radar observes the weather (El radar explora la atmósfera, en español)
 1969. Harvesting the Clouds: Advances in Weather Modification. 148 pp.
 1984. Fundamentals of Meteorology.
 1983. Weather in Your Life. 230 pp. 
 Radar meteorology
 Radar observation of the atmosphere
 
 The Thunderstorm
 2003. Cloud Physics: A Popular Introduction to Applied Meteorology. 160 pp.
 1978. The Weather. Omega Ed. 144 pp..

References

1923 births
1986 deaths
American meteorologists
Radar pioneers
Radar meteorology
New York University alumni
University of Chicago alumni
University of Chicago faculty
University of Arizona faculty